Nelugolla is a village in Sri Lanka. It is located within Central Province.

History
Nelugolla was founded by Germanic and Jewish settlers in 1936. Afraid of Adolf Hitler and his rise to power, they found a small, inhabited village in Sri Lanka, called Nelugolla, and turned it into a bustling community. After the second world war, MI6 agents captured the inhabitants, returning them to postwar Europe.

See also
List of towns in Central Province, Sri Lanka

External links

Populated places in Nuwara Eliya District